The Bendahara dynasty (Jawi:) is the current ruling dynasty of Pahang Sultanate, a constituent state of Malaysia. The royal house were of noble origin, holding the hereditary position of Bendahara (the highest rank in Malay nobility) in the courts of Singapura, Melaka and Old Johor since at least from the end of the 13th century. 

The ascendancy of the family as a royal house began in the late 17th century, when the last ruler of Johor from Melaka dynasty, Mahmud Shah II died without a male heir. In 1699, the reigning Bendahara at that time, Tun Abdul Jalil was proclaimed Abdul Jalil Shah IV of Johor, beginning the consolidation of Bendahara rule in the sultanate, with different family members holding both the titles of Sultan and Bendahara, and later the title of Temenggong.

At the same time, the state of Pahang was established as the special province, with successive Bendaharas ruling the state as their personal fief. In 1770, following the gradual dissolution of Johor empire, the state of Pahang was transformed into an autonomous kingdom under the grandson of Abdul Jalil IV, Tun Abdul Majid, whose descendants continued to rule Pahang until today. Another break-away state, the Riau-Lingga Sultanate was ruled by the descendants of Abdul Rahman Muazzam Shah, a great great grandson of Abdul Jalil IV, until its dissolution in 1911. A cadet branch, the House of Temenggong, has been ruling the modern Johor, through the descendants of Temenggong Abdul Jamal, another grandson of Abdul Jalil IV. 

Another branch, the royal house of Terengganu represents one of the junior male lines of the Bendahara dynasty. In 1717, Tun Zainal Abidin, the younger brother of Abdul Jalil IV established control over Terengganu with the title of Maharaja. He secured the recognition as the first sultan of the state from his nephew Sulaiman Badrul Alam Shah of Johor in 1725.

History
In classical Melaka and Johor Sultanates, a Bendahara was the most important and highest administrative position, serving as the chief of all ministers. As an adviser to the Sultan, a Bendahara was appointed by the Sultan and dismissible only by the Sultan himself. The position is hereditary and candidates were selected from the male descendants of the Bendahara family. The most notable of the Bendaharas was Tun Perak of Melaka Sultanate, who excelled in both war and diplomacy. Another notable Bendahara was Tun Sri Lanang of Johor Sultanate who was an important figure in the compilation of the Malay Annals.

The consolidation of Bendahara rule in the Johor Empire originated from the late 17th century. When Mahmud Shah II died in 1699 without a male heir, Bendahara Tun Abdul Jalil became the next Sultan of Johor and assumed the title Abdul Jalil Shah IV. His appointment was accepted by Johor chiefs based on the understanding that the Bendaharas would succeed to the throne if the Sultan died without heirs. During his reign, the eastern state of Pahang was established as a special province of the Bendahara family and ruled directly by the successive Bendaharas of the empire.

In 1717, Zainal Abidin, the younger brother of the Abdul Jalil Shah IV, established control over the eastern state of Terengganu with the title of Maharaja. He secured recognition as the first Sultan of Trengganu from his nephew Sulaiman Badrul Alam Shah of Johor in 1725. Meanwhile, in Pahang, a self-rule was established during the reign of Tun Abdul Majid when the state's status was changed from a tanah pegangan (provincial state) to tanah kurnia (fiefdom), thus the ruling Bendahara acquired the title Raja ('king') in Pahang. The allegiance of the Raja Bendahara to the Sultan however, continued, though it weakened in time.

The dismemberment of Johor Empire
During the reign of Mahmud Shah III, the great grandson of Abdul Jalil IV,  the Johor Empire at that time was approaching its dismemberment, with Sultan's power effectively reduced to the capital in Daik, Lingga. While the rest of the empire was administered by three powerful ministers, the Bendahara in Pahang, the Temenggong in Johor and Singapore, and the Yamtuan Muda in Riau. After the death of Mahmud Shah III, the empire became further irrevocably divided when a succession dispute among his two sons, gave rise to two centers of power, one in Riau-Lingga, under Abdul Rahman Muazzam Shah who was supported by the Bugis nobility and the Dutch, and the other in Johor mainland, under Hussein Shah who was supported by the Temenggung family and the British.

On March 17, 1824, the Dutch and the British concluded the Anglo-Dutch Treaty, whereby it was agreed that Singapore and the Peninsula should be the British sphere of influence, while the Dutch confined themselves to the islands south of Singapore. The signing of the Treaty further undermined the cohesion of the Johor Empire and contributed to the emergence of Pahang, Johor and Riau-Lingga as independent states. The breakaway Riau-Lingga Sultanate would exist as a Dutch protectorate until 1911, when it was abolished by the Dutch colonial administration. In Pahang Kingdom, the fourth Raja Bendahara, Tun Ali formally renounced his allegiance to the Sultan of Johor and became independent ruler of Pahang in 1853. Meanwhile, in Johor, Hussein Shah and his son Ali were reduced to puppet monarchs and played a minimal role in the administrative affairs of the state, which gradually came under the charge of the Temenggong and the British.

In 1855, Sultan Ali ceded the sovereignty rights of Johor (except Kesang in Muar) to Temenggong Daeng Ibrahim, in exchange for a formal recognition as the "Sultan of Johor" by the British and a monthly allowance. Following the secession of Johor, Sultan Ali was granted administrative charge over Muar until his death in 1877, and in most administrative matters, was often styled as the "Sultan of Muar".

Family tree
The genealogy of Bendahara family is obtained through several sources, but the most important is the Malay Annals that provide the extensive account from the era of Singapura up until Johor. Of all of the Bendaharas that have served the courts of Singapura, Melaka and Johor, it was the ancestry of Tun Habib Abdul Majid that became highly controversial, considering his eminent role as the great ancestor of the ruling dynasties of Johor, Pahang and Terengganu. There are several sources that provide contradicting information about his ancestry, which can be found in at least four versions of genealogy. 

Among the sources include the Salasilah Muar compiled by R.O Winstedt in A History of Johore (1365-1895). According to this version, the current ruling house of Bendahara are the patrilineal descendants of the Ba'Alawi Sada, an offshoot of the Banu Hashim tribe hailing from Hadhramaut, in what is now Yemen. They trace their lineage to al-Imam Ahmad al-Muhajir bin Isa ar-Rumi, a descendant of Shia Imam Ja'far as-Sadiq; who in turn is a direct descendant of Fatimah, the daughter of Muhammad, the prophet of Islam. In the late 16th century, a descendant of the Banu Hashim clan, Sayyid Idrus, was among the earliest Arab settlers that served as religious leaders in Aceh. The sultan of Aceh at that time persuaded Idrus to marry his daughter, and his son Sayyid Zaynal Abidin was born out of this union. Idrus’s son Zaynal Abidin also became a religious leader and migrated to Johor, where he married Tun Kaishi, the granddaughter of Tun Sri Lanang by his son, Tun Jenal. It was from this union, the father of Tun Habib Abdul Majid was born.

Meanwhile in several versions of Malay Annals, Tun Habib Abdul Majid is identified as 'Tun Habab' or 'Tun Habib' the son Tun Mad Ali, who in turn the son of Tun Sri Lanang. Tun Habib is described as still holding the title of 'Tun Pikrama' at the time the text was written. 'Tun Pikrama' is a title traditionally used for the future Bendahara. This implies that Tun Habib Abdul Majid was the direct descendant of the House of Bendahara who have been traditionally inheriting the title of Bendahara in the administration of Singapura, Melaka and Johor.

B.S.M   - Bendahara Seri Maharaja
B.S.N.D - Bendahara Seri Nara Diraja
B.S.R   - Bendahara Sewa Raja
B.P.R   - Bendahara Paduka Raja
B.P.T   - Bendahara Paduka Tuan
B.P.M   - Bendahara Paduka Maharaja
T.P.T   - Temenggung Paduka Tuan
T.S.M   - Temenggung Seri Maharaja
T.P.R   - Temenggung Paduka Raja

Notes

References

Bibliography
 
 
 
 
 
 
 
 
 
 
 
 
 
 
 
 
 
 

Malaysian royal families
.
.